The Nauvoo House in Nauvoo, Illinois, is a boarding house that Joseph Smith, the founder of the Latter Day Saint movement, began constructing in the 1840s. The boarding house was never completed, but the structure was later converted into a residential home and renamed the Riverside Mansion. The Nauvoo House, as it is referred to today, is part of the Nauvoo Historic District, a National Historic Landmark.

In January 1841, Smith received a revelation with instructions to construct a house in Nauvoo which would be "a resting-place for the weary traveler". The revelation also instructed that the building should be called the Nauvoo House, and set out detailed instructions about how the building of the house would be financed. George Miller, Lyman Wight, John Snider, and Peter Haws were appointed as the overseers of the project, and they created the Nauvoo House Association on 23 February 1841.

Construction of the Nauvoo House began later in 1841, with Smith placing the original manuscript of the Book of Mormon in the cornerstone of the building. Construction continued until 1844, when resources were pulled away from the Nauvoo House to concentrate on completion of the Nauvoo Temple.

After Smith and his brother Hyrum were killed by a mob in June 1844, their bodies were secretly buried in the cellar of the unfinished house to prevent their bodies from being stolen. Later, their bodies were removed and buried close to the Homestead.

After Smith's death, his widow Emma Smith retained title to the Nauvoo House. When the majority of Latter Day Saints left Nauvoo in the late 1840s, the house was still only partially completed. In the 1870s, Emma and her husband Lewis C. Bidamon converted the unfinished hotel into a smaller structure called the Riverside Mansion (also called Bidamon House). At this time, Lewis Bidamon removed the Book of Mormon manuscript from the cornerstone, and it was subsequently purchased by the Church of Jesus Christ of Latter-day Saints. Emma Bidamon and Lewis Bidamon  both lived in Riverside Mansion from 1871 until their deaths.

In 1909, the Reorganized Church of Jesus Christ of Latter Day Saints (RLDS Church) purchased the property. The Nauvoo House is still owned by the RLDS Church, which is now called the Community of Christ, and it operates the house as a dormitory available for group rental, as well as a stop on their guided walking tour of the Joseph Smith Historic Site.

Notes

External links

 Joseph Smith Historic Site, including the Nauvoo House, Community of Christ
 Historic Nauvoo: Joseph Smith Historic Site

Community of Christ
Historic house museums in Illinois
Joseph Smith
Latter Day Saint movement in Illinois
Museums in Hancock County, Illinois
Nauvoo, Illinois
Religious museums in Illinois
Significant places in Mormonism